The Blue Stack Mountains or Bluestack Mountains, also called the Croaghgorms, are the major mountain range in the south of County Donegal, Ireland. They provide a barrier between the south of the county, such as Donegal Town and Ballyshannon, and the towns to the north and west such as Dungloe and Letterkenny. The road between the two parts of the county goes through the Barnesmore Gap.

Nearby summits include Ardnageer (Croaghanirwore, Croaghbarnes, Croaghblane, Croaghnageer, Croveenananta, Gaugin Mountain, Lacroagh, Lavagh More and Lavagh Beg. Silver Hill, is the smallest mountain in Ireland to meet the 600 m threshold for a Simms classification.

PGallery

References

External links

Mountains and hills of County Donegal
Gaeltacht places in County Donegal